Two ships in the United States Navy have been named USS Finch. The first ship was named for the bird and the second ship for Joseph W. Finch Jr.

 The first  was commissioned in 1918 and sunk in enemy action in 1942; salvaged by the IJN and sunk 1945
 The second  was named shortly after the first USS Finch went down in battle. She was commissioned in 1943 and decommissioned in 1947

United States Navy ship names